BANCStar can mean:

 BANCStar (software), a software system for banks
 The BANCStar programming language, a computer language used by the BANCStar software